The Institute of the Peoples of the North is a research and later educationary institute based in Saint Petersburg. Its objective is to examine topics related to the northern minorities in the Soviet Union, and to prepare teachers for the northern boarding schools. One of the central figures involved in the research institute was Vladimir Bogoraz.

History
The institute was founded in 1930, as four years previously it had become possible to study the languages of the northern peoples in their own right at the Institute for Eastern Studies at Leningrad State University. By the end of 1929, the institute's teachers had joined forces to create the Unified Northern Alphabet for use by the linguistic minorities living in the north of the Soviet Union. The alphabet consisted of 32 Latin-based letters, some of which were equipped with diacritics. For practical reasons, i.e., typographical reasons, a move to rid the alphabet of graphemes using diacritics was made and one year later a new version was ready. On December 13, 1930, the Presidium of the Scientific Investigation Association at the institute presented a version of the Unified Northern Alphabet to the Scientific Council of the USSR's Central Committee on Alphabet Adaptation. The same body discussed the draft again on December 18 and it was approved on February 23, 1931. The scientific section of Narkompros approved the draft in May the same year.

The alphabet consisted of 39 letters: 29 consonants and 10 vowels. In addition, some letters were marked with diacritics to show palatalization, length and aspiration.

An intensive and systematic publishing campaign was launched immediately after the alphabet had been formally approved. From 1939 to 1949, approximately 300 experts were employed by the institute.

The finalisation of principles for creation of a literary public institution for the peoples of the north came at the first pan-Russian conference. Delegates to the conference (which was held at the INS in Leningrad) were representatives for Narkompros, Komitet Severa v/Presidium VCIK, CK Novogo Alfavita SSSR i RSFSR, and the publisher Učpedgiz. In the work conducted at the conference, there were participants from the national northern okrugs, for the local Northern Committees, for CK VLKSM, for the soviet Academy of Sciences, for the Historical-linguistic institute in Leningrad, and for the Northern department at the Leningrad Herzen Pedagogical Institute. The preparation work was done at INS.

The conference decided to create orthographies for a total of 16 languages and to have books available for the 15th anniversary of the revolution:

 the Uralic languages: Nenets, Selkup, Khanty, Mansi and Kildin Sami
 the Tungusic languages: Evenki, Even, Nanai and Udege
 the Paleosiberian languages: Chukchi, Koryak, Itelmen, Siberian Yupik, Aleut, Nivkh and Ket

Various books, including primers and math textbooks, were published using this alphabet. The first work published using the new orthography was a book on terminology specific to these areas.

After World War II

The institute was run in its original form from 1930 until 1941. Between 1942 and 1945, the institute was located in Omsk, after which it moved back to Leningrad as a part of the Faculty of Oriental Studies at Leningrad State University. Since 1948, the institute has been a part of the Herzen University, to which it still belongs today.

Notable people
 Nina Afanasyeva (b. 1939), Russian-Sami politician and language activist
 Maria Barmich (b. 1934), Nenets linguist, professor, author of Nenets textbooks

References

Bibliography 

 
 
 
 

Language policy in Russia
Research institutes in the Soviet Union
Research institutes in Russia
1930 establishments in the Soviet Union
Cultural heritage monuments of regional significance in Saint Petersburg